Strongyloididae is a family of nematodes belonging to the order Rhabditida.

Genera:
 Leipernema Narayan Singh, 1976
 Parastrongyloides Morgan, 1928
 Strongyloides Grassi, 1879

References

Nematodes